Singhanakhon is a district (amphoe) in the northern part of Songkhla province, southern Thailand.

Geography
Neighboring districts are (from the south clockwise): Mueang Songkhla, Hat Yai, Khuan Niang of Songkhla Province; Pak Phayun of Phatthalung province; and Sathing Phra of Songkhla Province. To the east is the Gulf of Thailand.

The district is between Thale Luang and Songkhla Lake.

History
The minor district (king amphoe) was created on 15 February 1988, when 11 tambons were split off from Mueang Songkhla district. It was upgraded to a full district on 19 July 1991.

Administration

The district is divided into 11 sub-districts (tambons), which are further subdivided into 77 villages (mubans). Singhanakhon is a township (thesaban tambon) which covers parts of tambons Ching Kho and Thamnop and tambon Hua Khao and Sathing Mo. There are a further nine tambon administrative organizations (TAO).

References

External links
amphoe.com

Districts of Songkhla province